Víctor Manuel Ávila Haro (23 March 1977) is a Mexican professional basketball player currently with the CIBACOPA team Caballeros de Culiacán. Since the  CIBACOPA takes place for only a few months a year, Avila also plays for Halcones UV Xalapa in the LNBP. Throughout his career, Avila has played professional basketball in the United States, Mexico, Czech Republic and Puerto Rico. He has represented Mexico’s national basketball team on many occasions.

Achievements

Individual
1999, 2003–07, 2009: Mexico national basketball team
2008: Mexico LNBP MVP
2006, 2007, 2009: Mexico CIBACOPA All Star Game
2004, 2005, 2009: Mexico LNBP All Star Game
1998: 2nd Team JUCO All-American
1997: JUCO Conference Freshman of the Year

Team
2010: Mexico CIBACOPA Champion
2009: Mexico Southern Division CIBACOPA Champion
2008-2010: Mexico LNBP Champion
2007: Champion of FIBA COCABA Championship
2004, 2005: Mexico LNBP Regular Season Champion
2003: Centrobasket Bronze Medal
2002: NBDL Regular Season Champion

References

External links
Oklahoma bio
 RealGM profile

1977 births
Living people
Atléticos de San Germán players
Caballeros de Culiacán players
Centers (basketball)
Charleston Lowgators players
Halcones de Xalapa players
Junior college men's basketball players in the United States
Mexican men's basketball players
Mexican expatriate basketball people in the United States
Oklahoma Sooners men's basketball players
Ostioneros de Guaymas (basketball) players
San Diego Wildfire players
Sportspeople from Culiacán
Tijuana Zonkeys players
Venados de Mazatlán (basketball) players
Basketball players from Sinaloa